Baseball was contested by six teams at the 1994 Asian Games in Hiroshima, Japan from October 9 to October 14.

Schedule

Medalists

Results
All times are Japan Standard Time (UTC+09:00)

Preliminary round

Group A

Group B

5th place game

Final round

Semifinals

Bronze medal game

Final

Final standing

References
 New Straits Times, October 9–15, 1994
 Results for October 9
 Results for October 10
 Results for October 11
 Results for October 13 at page 47
 Results for October 14
 Results (Hiroshima City University website)
 The Hankyoreh, Results for October 9

External links
 www.ocasia.org

 
1994 Asian Games events
1994
Asian Games
1994 Asian Games